Michael Rowe (born 1971 in Ballarat, Australia) is an Australian film director and screenwriter.

Rowe studied English post-colonial literature at La Trobe University in Melbourne, Australia. His artistic career first began as a poet, winning the Melbourne Fringe Festival Poetry Prize. He then moved to theatre and wrote three plays. In 1994, at the age of 23, he traveled to Mexico and made it his adoptive home. In 1998, while in Mexico, he began a career as a journalist while studying screenwriting at a Vincente Leñero workshop. In 2005, one of his first scripts, Naturalezas muertas won at the Instituto Mexicano de Cinematografía. In 2006, he directed his first short film, Cacahuates. Silencio followed in 2007. Though English is his native language, the bulk of his film work is done in Spanish.

In 2010, Rowe directed Año bisiesto (Leap Year), which garnered him the Caméra d'Or prize for best first time feature film director at the Cannes Film Festival.  The film was well received by critics.

His follow-up film, The Well (Manto acuífero) premiered at the Rome Film Festival in 2013.

In 2013, it was announced that Rowe is working on his English feature debut slated for production in Montreal, Quebec, Canada. The film is a co-production between a Quebec production house  Possibles Media (run by (fr) Serge Noël) and Australia's Freshwater Pictures (run by Trish Lake) and stars Suzanne Clément. The film had a first cut shown in Melbourne film festival where it was reviewed, but the official international premiere of the director's cut was at the Venice Mostra where it won the Venice Days Award for 2015.

Theatre 
 Impudence and Innocence (1993)
 Reprise for Godot (1993)

Feature films 
 Leap Year  (Año bisiesto) (2010)
 The Well (Manto acuífero) (2013)
 Early Winter (2015)

References

External links 

 https://www.imdb.com/title/tt2341644/
 http://www.evene.fr/celebre/biographie/michael-rowe-54127.php
 http://possiblesmedia.blogspot.ca/2012/12/possibles-media-au-cinemart-2013-rest.html
 https://web.archive.org/web/20130929181002/http://www.afi.org.au/AM/ContentManagerNet/HTMLDisplay.aspx?ContentID=11473&Section=QandA_with_Michael_Rowe_director_of_Leap_Year_A_o_Bisiesto_
 https://web.archive.org/web/20140116094812/https://www.festivalscope.com/director/rowe-michael
 http://www.rottentomatoes.com/m/ano_bisiesto/#contentReviews

1971 births
Living people
Australian film directors
Directors of Caméra d'Or winners